Nupserha basalis is a species of beetle in the family Cerambycidae. It was described by Wilhelm Ferdinand Erichson in 1843. It has a wide distribution in Africa.

Subspecies
 Nupserha basalis basalis (Erichson, 1843)
 Nupserha basalis apicalis (Fahraeus, 1872)
 Nupserha basalis urundiensis Breuning, 1955
 Nupserha basalis quadripunctata Lepesme & Breuning, 1952
 Nupserha basalis rufifrons Breuning, 1981

References

basalis
Beetles described in 1843